Tigh may refer to:

Tígh, an Irish term referring to a house or residence such as tigh dubh which translates as blackhouse
Colonel Tigh, a fictional character in the original Battlestar Galactica television series
Colonel Saul Tigh, a fictional character in the "re-imagined" Battlestar Galactica series
Ellen Tigh, the wife of Saul Tigh